Joshua James Alphonse Franceschi (born 7 August 1990) is an English singer and songwriter. He is the lead vocalist of rock band You Me at Six.

Early life
Josh was born to parents Anne Franceschi and Christian Franceschi in Weybridge, Surrey. He is of Corsican-French (paternal) descent. He has one sister, Elissa Franceschi who is also a vocalist. He lived in Cyprus in his early childhood, but later moved to Twickenham to live with his grandmother. At the age of 9, he moved back to Weybridge, Surrey. He attended Heathside School until he was 16, and then moved to Esher College, where he studied A-Levels in politics, history and film studies. He now lives in north London.

Public image

Ticket touts 
In 2016, Josh Franceschi began to criticise the way that tickets are re-sold for extortionate prices as there were consequences for both musicians and fans. He, along with a variety of other musicians came together under the Fan Fair Alliance to tackle the touts. Franceschi spoke against the rising issue along with Ian McAndrew and Annabella Coldrick in Parliament; many MPs backed the argument, agreeing that something must be done.

Personal life 
Josh Franceschi is vegan. The band all organised a pop-up vegan kebab shop at the release of their album VI. He is an Arsenal fan. In 2021 Franceschi tweeted that he is the cousin of McFly bassist Dougie Poynter.

Discography

Guest appearances
"Salt" (with Elissa Franceschi)
"This is Why We Can't Have Nice Things (I Don't Care)" (with The Blackout)
"Fuck" (with Bring Me the Horizon)
"A Decade Drifting" (with Your Demise)
"Not Alone" (with Kid Arkade)
"24" (with Hellions)
"Outlines" (with All Time Low on Straight to DVD II: Past, Present and Future Hearts)
"Lose My Mind" (with James Arthur)
"Hallucinate" (with Yours Truly)

References

1990 births
Living people
English male singer-songwriters
British people of Corsican descent
English people of French descent
English people of Scottish descent
English people of Welsh descent
People from Weybridge